Fair Lady is a 1922 American silent drama film directed by Kenneth Webb. The film stars Betty Blythe, Thurston Hall and Robert Elliott. The film was based on the novel The Net by Rex Beach. It is not known whether the film currently survives.

Plot
In Sicily, Count Martinello is assassinated by Cardi and his mafia group on what would have been his wedding day. His bride to be, Countess Margherita, gets word of this from American Norvin Blake, who fails to protect her from Cardi, who wants her for his own. Later, Margherita and Norvin meet in New Orleans, where he declares his love for her.

Recognizing Gian Norcone as the group leader that killed the count, Norvin has him arrested after getting into a fight with him. Caesar Maruffi, a supposed friend and admirer who suits Margherita, is discovered to be Cardi. In the middle of a fight between Cardi and Norvin, Cardi is stabbed by Lucrezia, Margherita's maid. In the end, Norvin finally wins Margherita.

Cast

 Betty Blythe as Countess Margherita  
 Thurston Hall as Italian banker Caesar Maruffi / Cardi
 Robert Elliott as Norvin Blake  
 Gladys Hulette as Myra Nell Drew  
 Florence Auer as Lucrezia  
 Walter James as Gian Norcone
 Macey Harlam as Count Modene
 Henry Leone as Ricardo  
 Effingham Pinto as Count Martinello  
 Arnold Lucy as Uncle Bernie Drew

References

External links

1922 films
Films based on American novels
American black-and-white films
American silent feature films
Films shot in New Orleans
American crime drama films
Films based on works by Rex Beach
1922 crime drama films
1920s American films
Silent American drama films